Dennis Luyt is a Dutch general in the Royal Netherlands Air Force.  he serves as Commander of the Royal Netherlands Air Force.

References

Living people
Year of birth missing (living people)
Place of birth missing (living people)
Commanders of the Royal Netherlands Air Force